Ingram Tom Moore High School is a small public high school in Ingram, Texas, USA serving grades 9–12. It is the only high school in the Ingram Independent School District, and is attended by students from West Kerr County. Built in 1976, ITMHS opened in 1980 as the first school in west Kerr County and was named at the request of Tom Moore, who donated the land it rests on today.

As of the 2015 school year, the school has an enrollment of 451 students, which places Ingram in the 3A class when competing in University Interscholastic League (UIL). Ingram has been classified as a 3A school for the 2014 school year, and years following. The mascot is the Warrior and the colors are red, black, and white.

History

Although the main building (including the office and 16 classrooms) was constructed in 1976, it wasn't until 1980 that the first classes were held. When the school opened, the following words were etched in the foyer: "Ingram Moore High School , established 1980, a student centered school in a student centered community where the standard of quality education will not be compromised." The school was named in honor of Tom Moore after the large land grant he provided.

Academics and curriculum
In 2019, the Texas Education Agency awarded Ingram ISD an “A” rating for academic performance, the only one in the area. This, in large part, is due to the strong academic performance of Ingram Tom Moore High School.

The school is notable for offering a large number of AP classes for its size, with courses in English Language and Composition, English Literature and Composition, Government, Macroeconomics, U. S. History, Calculus AB, Physics B, Environmental Science, Biology, Art, Music  and Chemistry among others.  Ingram Tom Moore High School is transitioning into an Early College High School beginning with the 2020-2021 school year. Currently Ingram Tom Moore High School Students are offered 42+ college hours, all free of charge.

Campus
For a school of its size, the physical footprint is sprawling. The land is shared with Ingram Middle School, but the majority is used for high school activities. Visitors often liken the facility to that of a junior college.

Extracurricular activities

Athletics
Since 1980 the Warriors have won one state championship in the major sports, that coming in basketball in 1990. In the mid-2000s the basketball team had nice success, going to the state quarterfinal in 2004 and in 2005. Football has gone to the playoffs only seven times, in a surprisingly long amount of time of being unsuccessful. On the other hand, tennis is extremely successful and competes at state team pretty much every year. Additionally, they now compete against 4A schools during the fall season and in the fall of 2021 went to playoffs.

Agricultural Science Department
Ingram Tom Moore High School is well-known for its AG department and FFA. The various teams that compete for the Ingram FFA have placed well in all levels of competition. Unlike other school competitions, FFA teams do not compete only against other 3-A teams; they compete against teams from schools of all sizes.

Band
The Warrior band is part of the musical program offered at Ingram ISD. The band has a prestigious record, with a current two year sweepstakes at UIL Region marching, multiple Area appearances, and one finalist title at Area. The band advanced to their first UIL Area competition in 40 years and earning their very first sweepstakes in school history with the show entitled "Eye of the Storm" during the 2019-2020 season. This year, the band advanced to the UIL Area D competition and made finals the first time in school history, placing 5th out of the 17 bands there. The 2020-2021 show was entitled "If I only".  The band is currently under the direction of Mr. Samuel Bigott and the current Drum Major of the 2022-2023 season is Makayne White. The Warrior Band competes in Concert and Marching UIL Region 29 competition and ATSSB All-Region and State auditions for concert and jazz. The Warrior band also fields a successful Jazz Band called the Jazz Chieftains which performs a number of gigs every year.

Theatre
The Tom Moore Warrior Thespian troupe has been very successful with numerous district, area and state appearances and wins. Under the direction of Jacqueline Kana, the Warrior theater department is housed in a 700 seat, state of the art performing arts center, the only one of its kind in the area.

The Theatre Department has seen great success in UIL One Act Play over the years, taking top honors in many contests, including the following awards over time:

2004-2005 – 1st in District, 1st in Area

2012-2013 – 3rd in District

2013-2014 – 2nd in District, 2nd in Area, 1st in Regional

2015-2016 – 2nd in District, 3rd in Bi-District, 2nd in Area

2016-2017 – 1st in District, 4th in Bi-District

2017-2018 – 2nd in District, 4th in Bi-District

2018-2019 – 2nd in District, 4th in Bi-District

2019-2020 – District (Advanced)

2020-2021 – 2nd in District, 3rd in Bi-District

References

External links
 

Schools in Kerr County, Texas
Public high schools in Texas
School buildings completed in 1980
1980s architecture in the United States
Educational institutions in the United States with year of establishment missing